Dhakuakhana College was established in 1966 at Nabakatharbari, Dhakuakhana, about 2 km distant to the west from Dhakuakhana town. The college is affiliated to Dibrugarh University and is recognized by UGC under sections 2(f) and 12(B).  The college was under the Deficit system of Grant in Aid in 1975 and was brought under the provincialised system by the Government of Assam in December, 2005. The current principal is Dr. Jugananda Sut and the vice principal is Chandra Sarma. The college campus is about 14.95 acres.

History
Most of the inhabitants of Dhakuakhana are from the underprivileged sections of society. This institution is the reflection of the desire and interest in higher education of the people of Dhakuakhana. This college has the pride of stepping in the golden jubilee year in 2015 and the inaugural program of Golden Jubilee Celebration was held on 25 July 2015.

Facilities
Total no of departments available=16
Teaching faculty=49
Non teaching=24

Others
Library- this institution has one library with more than 18000 books, various magazines, journals and newspapers. The college also has the facility of Digital library for students.
Laboratory
Playground
Girls’ and Boys’ hostel
Bio tech hub
NSS
Study centre of Krishna Kanta handique State Open University

References

Universities and colleges in Assam
Colleges affiliated to Dibrugarh University
1966 establishments in Assam
Educational institutions established in 1966